The 2023 Judo Grand Prix Almada was held at the Complexo Municipal dos Desportos da Cidade de Almada in Almada, Portugal, from 27 to 29 January 2023 as part of the IJF World Tour and during the 2024 Summer Olympics qualification period.

Medal summary

Men's events

Women's events

Source results:

Medal table

Prize money
The sums written are per medalist, bringing the total prizes awarded to €98,000. (retrieved from:)

References

External links
 

2023 IJF World Tour
2023 Judo Grand Prix
Judo
Grand Prix 2023
Sport in Almada
Judo
Judo